Gotheye is a village and rural commune in Niger. Gotheye is situated in Tillaberi, Tillabery, Niger, its geographical coordinates are 13° 51' 26" North, 1° 33' 55" East.

References

Communes of Niger